Lygodactylus roellae is a species of gecko endemic to Madagascar.

References

Lygodactylus
Reptiles described in 2022
Endemic fauna of Madagascar